Tiverton and Honiton is a constituency in Devon, England. The current MP is Richard Foord of the Liberal Democrats, elected at a by-election on 23 June 2022. 

Prior to the by-election, the constituency had always returned a Conservative MP since its creation in 1997. The by-election was held following the resignation of Neil Parish after he was caught watching pornography in the House of Commons chamber (Parish himself admitted to doing so on two separate occasions).

Constituency profile
This is a mostly rural constituency covering a broad sweep between Exmoor to the north and Lyme Bay to the south, including the towns of Tiverton and Honiton and their surrounding villages (which include extensive farmland, rivers popular with kayakers and part of the Blackdown Hills). Some residents commute to Exeter. Residents' wealth is around average for the UK.

Boundaries 	

1997–2010: The District of Mid Devon except the wards of Taw, Taw Vale, and West Creedy, and the District of East Devon wards of Broadclyst, Clystbeare, Clyst Valley, Exe Valley, Honiton St Michael's, Honiton St Paul's, Otterhead, Ottery St Mary Rural, Ottery St Mary Town, Patteson, and Tale Vale.

2010–present: The District of Mid Devon wards of Canonsleigh, Castle, Clare and Shuttern, Cranmore, Cullompton North, Cullompton Outer, Cullompton South, Halberton, Lower Culm, Lowman, Upper Culm, and Westexe, and the District of East Devon wards of Axminster Rural, Axminster Town, Beer and Branscombe, Coly Valley, Dunkeswell, Feniton and Buckerell, Honiton St Michael's, Honiton St Paul's, Newbridges, Otterhead, Seaton, Tale Vale, Trinity, and Yarty.

Boundary changes for 2010 
Parliament accepted the Boundary Commission's Fifth Periodic Review of Westminster constituencies which slightly altered this constituency for the 2010 general election, and gave Devon 12 seats instead of 11.  Some wards of Mid Devon District in this seat were transferred to the new Central Devon constituency; however, parts of the East Devon constituency, including the towns of Axminster and Seaton, were gained in return.

History
The seat came about when the town of Honiton from the Honiton constituency was added to the Tiverton constituency in 1997. Both were long-established seats, with the former having existed from 1640 and the latter from 1615. Both elected two Members of Parliament until the 1884 Reform Act reduced the number for both to one and their area was widened to cover two divisions of the county under the Redistribution of Seats Act 1885.

Prominent holders of the seats in the 19th century included Whig politician Joseph Locke, a railway pioneer, who was MP for Honiton, and Lord Palmerston, who, while MP for Tiverton, served as the first Prime Minister from the newly formed Liberal Party (1855–1858 and 1859–1865).

The area served by the constituency had not been represented by a party other than the Conservative Party in Westminster since 1923. Following the 2022 Tiverton and Honiton by-election, the Liberal Democrats gained the seat from the Conservatives.

Members of Parliament

Elections

Elections in the 2020s

Elections in the 2010s

Elections prior to the 2010s

See also 
 List of parliamentary constituencies in Devon

Notes

References

Sources 
 

Parliamentary constituencies in Devon
Constituencies of the Parliament of the United Kingdom established in 1997
Tiverton, Devon